Sefer is a village located in the municipality of Preševo, Serbia. According to the 2002 census, the village had a population of 57 (100,0 %) people, all Albanians.

Notable people
 Idriz Seferi, Albanian nationalist figure

References

Populated places in Pčinja District
Albanian communities in Serbia